Arts and Technology High School, known as ATHS or ArtTech, was a public charter high school in Wilsonville, Oregon, United States. Part of the West Linn-Wilsonville School District, the school opened in 2005. it closed at the end of the 2021-2022 school year. The main Art Tech campus as well as the adjacent Kiva Administration Building have since been turned back over to the City of Wilsonville (the owners of the buildings), and are now utilizing it for various purposes.

Academics
In 2008, 83% of the school's seniors received a high school diploma. Of 24 students, 20 graduated, 2 dropped out, and two were still in high school in 2009.

References

High schools in Clackamas County, Oregon
Charter schools in Oregon
Buildings and structures in Wilsonville, Oregon
Educational institutions established in 2005
Public high schools in Oregon
2005 establishments in Oregon